Elvira, te daría mi vida pero la estoy usando  (Spanish for: Elvira, I would give you my life but I am using it)  is a 2014 Mexican comedy-drama film produced by Cecilia Suárez and directed by Manolo Caro. Starring Cecilia Suárez, Luis Gerardo Méndez and Vanessa Bauche. It was one of fourteen films shortlisted by Mexico to be their submission for the Academy Award for Best Foreign Language Film at the 88th Academy Awards, but it lost out to 600 Miles.

Plot
Elvira (Cecilia Suárez), a 40-year-old woman, is a stay-at-home mother with two children while her husband, Gustavo (Carlos Bardem), works at an insurance company to support the family. One night, Gustavo tells his wife that he is going for cigars and does not return.

Concerned about her husband, Elvira comes to seek him and files a missing person, because she believes that he suffered an accident. As time passes, she continues with her quest and begins to find reasons to suspect that her husband has escaped with his lover.

Cast
Cecilia Suárez as Elvira
Luis Gerardo Méndez as Ricardo
Vanessa Bauche as Luisa
Angie Cepeda as Eloy
Carlos Bardem as Gustavo
Angélica Aragón as Mamá de Elvira
Juan Carlos Colombo as Don Ruti
Alfonso Dosal as Pepe
Juan Pablo Medina as Ejecutivo
Zuria Vega as Ana
Mariana Treviño as Guille
María Elena Saldaña as Portera
Silverio Palacios as Don Chuy

References

External links

2014 films
2014 comedy-drama films
Mexican comedy-drama films
2010s Mexican films